This is a list of musical recordings by Irish singer-songwriter Damien Rice.

Officially released

Unreleased songs
The following are songs that have either been performed live or demoed, yet remain officially unreleased.

Notes
Lisa Hannigan appears on the majority of releases from 2001 to 2007.

References

External links
 damienrice.com
 irishmusiccentral.com

Lists of songs recorded by Irish artists